Fletcher Creek is a rural locality in the Rockhampton Region, Queensland, Australia.

Geography
The Dee River forms most of the western boundary.

Road infrastructure
The Burnett Highway runs past to the west.

References 

Suburbs of Rockhampton Region
Localities in Queensland